Merychyus is an extinct genus of oreodont of the family Merycoidodontidae, endemic to North America. Fossils are widespread through the central and western United States.

Merychyus was a herbivore with a short face, tusk-like canine teeth, heavy body, long tail, short feet, and four-toed hooves.

Paleoecology 
Fossils of Merychyus have been uncovered from Agate Fossil Beds National Monument. Merychyus was a common prey item for the beardog Daphoenodon, as over half of all herbivore remains uncovered from Daphoenodon burrows at Agate Fossil Beds belonged to Merychyus.

Fossil distribution 
Fossils of the genus have been found in:
Arikareean
 Chalk Canyon Formation, Arizona
 Diligencia, Sespe & Tick Canyon Formations, California 
 Arikaree Formation, North Dakota
 John Day Formation, Oregon
 Delaho Formation, Texas
 Colter, Harrison & Marsland Formations, Wyoming

Harrisonian
 Hector Formation, California
 Agate Springs, Harrison, Marsland & Wildcat Hills Beds Formations, Nebraska
 Rosebud Formation, South Dakota
 Delaho Formation, Texas
 Harrison & Marsland Formations, Wyoming

Other Miocene
 Cypress Hills Formation, Hemingfordian Saskatchewan, Canada
 Suchilquitongo Formation, Mexico
 Barstow, Bopesta, Branch Canyon, Hector, Kramer Beds & Vaqueros Formations, California
 Browns Park & Pawnee Creek Formations, Colorado
 Railroad Canyon Beds Formation, Idaho
 Fleming Formation, Louisiana 
 Runningwater, Sheep Creek, Olcott, Loop Fork, Box Butte, Valentine & Ash Hollow Formations, Nebraska
 Truckee & Monarch Mill Formations, Nevada 
 Tesuque, Zia Sand & Abiquiu Formations, New Mexico 
 Laverne Formation, Oklahoma 
 Juntura & John Day Formations, Oregon
 Arikaree & Batesland Formations, South Dakota
 Goliad Formation, Texas
 Marsland, Colter, North Park, Arikaree & Carpenter Ranch Formations, Wyoming

References

Bibliography 
 J. Leidy. 1858. Notice of Remains of Extinct Vertebrata, from the Valley of the Niobrara River, Collected during the Exploring Expedition of 1857, in Nebraska, under the Command of Lieut. G. K. Warren, U. S. Top. Eng., by Dr. F. V. Hayden, Geologist to the Expedition. Proceedings of the Academy of Natural Sciences of Philadelphia 10:15-89
Hunt Jr, R.M., 1990. Nebraska and Wyoming; A paleobiota entombed in fine-grained volcaniclastic rocks. Volcanism and Fossil Biotas, 244, p.69.
Hunt Jr, R.M., Skolnick, R. and Kaufman, J., 2019. The Carnivores of Agate Fossil Beds National Monument. Lulu. com.

 
Miocene even-toed ungulates
Aquitanian first appearances
Burdigalian life
Langhian life
Serravallian life
Tortonian extinctions
Miocene mammals of North America
Arikareean
Barstovian
Clarendonian
Hemingfordian
Fossil taxa described in 1858
Taxa named by Joseph Leidy
Prehistoric even-toed ungulate genera